Global Underground 014: John Digweed, Hong Kong is a DJ mix album in the Global Underground series, compiled and mixed by John Digweed. The mix is a retrospective look at a set played at the Regal Kowloon hotel in Hong Kong.

Track listing

Disc one
 Underworld - "Cups" – 8:26
 Madder Rose - "Overflow" – 3:47
 A.D.N.Y. Presents Leiva - "Something for the Soul" – 4:12
 L.S.G. - "Into Deep" – 5:54
 Sphere - "Gravi Tech" – 6:52
 Francesco Farfa - "Tribe and Trance (Voyager Mix)" – 7:14
 Lexicon Avenue - "Here I Am (Hard Mix)" – 7:14
 Luzon - "The Baguio Track" – 5:39
 Cevin Fisher - "Music Saved My Life" – 6:59
 Jean Phillippe Aviance - "Useless" – 5:03
 Medway - "Flanker" – 7:00

Disc two
 Pob - "Glide" – 3:52
 Tilt - "36" (Tilt's Numerology Dub) – 7:30
 Moonface - "Futurized" – 5:47
 Cass & Slide - "Diablo (Evolution Mix)" – 7:30
 Van M & Leedz - "More" – 7:12
 Breeder - "Sputnik (New York FM Remix)" – 7:26
 Science Department - "Persuasion" – 5:46
 Johan - "Crash" – 3:50
 Hole in One - "Amran in the 7th Phase" – 5:02
 Ingmar - "To the Rescue" – 6:14
 Bedrock - "Heaven Scent" – 6:43
 Stoneproof - "And She Does" – 6:49

References

External links

Global Underground
John Digweed albums
1999 albums
DJ mix albums